Shūshin may refer to:

Shūshin koyō, a term for permanent employment in Japan
Gidō Shūshin (1325–1388), Japanese writer
Gusukuma Shūshin (1507–1585), Japanese bureaucrat of the Ryukyu Kingdom

Japanese masculine given names